Myrna Dey is a Canadian writer, whose debut novel Extensions was a longlisted nominee for the 2011 Scotiabank Giller Prize. It was the first novel ever named to the longlist through the award's new Readers' Choice program, which allowed the general public to nominate books for award consideration.

A native of Calgary, Alberta, Dey studied at the University of Alberta and the University of California, Berkeley. She currently lives in Kamsack, Saskatchewan with her husband, a dentist. She has published short stories and journalism in Reader's Digest, Canadian Living, the National Post, The Globe and Mail and Maclean's.

Dey was a 2014 semi-finalist in Chatelaine Magazine's "Write for Chatelaine Contest" with a poignant personal essay entitled "Into the Storm" about helping her husband to build a new reality in the wake of dementia.

Works
Extensions (2010)

References

External links
Myrna Dey at NeWest Press

Canadian women novelists
Writers from Calgary
Living people
Writers from Saskatchewan
People from Kamsack, Saskatchewan
21st-century Canadian novelists
Canadian women short story writers
21st-century Canadian women writers
21st-century Canadian short story writers
Year of birth missing (living people)